Clamp may refer to:

Tools and devices
Brick clamp, an early method of baking bricks
Clamp (tool), a device or tool used to hold objects in a fixed relative position (many types listed)
C-clamp
C-clamp (stagecraft)
Riser clamp, a device used to support vertical piping
Nipple clamp, a sex toy
Storage clamp, an agricultural root crop storage
Wheel clamp, a device used with road vehicles to prevent theft or enforce parking restrictions

Biology and medicine
 CLAMP (Climate leaf analysis multivariate program), a method for characterizing past climates
 Clamp (zoology), an attachment structure found in some parasitic flatworms
 Clamp connection, a structure formed by hyphal cells of certain fungi
 DNA clamp, a ring-like structure associated with DNA replication and other phenomena
 Glucose clamp technique, a method for quantifying insulin secretion and resistance
 Patch clamp, a technique used to hold a natural cell membrane or artificial lipid bilayer

Electronics and software
Clamping (graphics), the process of limiting a position to an area
Clamper (electronics), an electrical circuit that limits one extreme of a signal by offsetting the signal
Clipper (electronics), an electrical circuit that limits one extreme of a signal by holding the signal back
Current clamp, a device for measuring electric current
Voltage clamp, a technique and device used to measure ion transport across cells
Wire clamp, hardware that secures wire or cable, or a clamp made of wire
Wire clamp connector, a solderless electrical connector using screws or crimping

Fictional characters
 Clamp, a character in the television show Galactik Football
 Clamps, a member of the Robot Mafia in Futurama

Other uses
 CLAMP, an all-female Japanese manga artist group that formed in the mid-1980s
 Clamp (surname), a surname
  (90+)
  (includes redirects)